The Wake Forest Demon Deacons college football team represents Wake Forest University in the Atlantic Coast Conference (ACC). The Demon Deacons compete as part of the NCAA Division I Football Bowl Subdivision. The program has had 32 head coaches since it began play during the 1888 season. Since December 2013, Dave Clawson has served as head coach at Wake Forest.

Six coaches have led Wake Forest in postseason bowl games: Peahead Walker, John Mackovic, Bill Dooley, Jim Caldwell, Jim Grobe, and Clawson. Two of those coaches also won conference championships: Cal Stoll and Grobe each captured one as a member of the Atlantic Coast Conference.

Peahead Walker is the leader in games won and seasons coached with 77 wins in his 14 years as head coach each. Hank Garrity has the highest winning percentage at 0.722. Bill Hildebrand has the lowest winning percentage of those who have coached more than one game, with 0.175.

Key

Coaches

Notes

References

Wake Forest

Wake Forest Demon Deacons football coaches